Scott High School may refer to:

United States
Scott High School (Kentucky), located in Taylor Mill, Kentucky
Scott High School (Ohio), located in Toledo, Ohio
Scott High School (West Virginia), located in Madison West Virginia
Clifford Scott High School, located in East Orange, New Jersey from 1937–2002
North Braddock Scott High School, located in North Braddock, Pennsylvania

Cayman Islands
Layman E. Scott Sr. High School, located in Cayman Brac, Cayman Islands